Adriano Manuel Vieira da Luz (born 9 April 1959) is a Portuguese actor. He has appeared in more than 90 films since 1987.

Selected filmography

References

External links
 

1959 births
Living people
People from Porto
Portuguese male film actors
Portuguese male television actors
20th-century Portuguese male actors
21st-century Portuguese male actors